Warren is a town in Litchfield County, Connecticut, United States. The population was 1,351 at the 2020 census. The town was named for Revolutionary War General Joseph Warren.

On July 1, 2006, businessman Joseph Cicio placed most of Warren's commercial district on eBay for $5,000,000.

Geography

Demographics

As of the census of 2000, there were 1,254 people, 497 households, and 353 families living in the town. There were 650 housing units at an average density of 24.7 per square mile (9.5/km). The racial makeup of the town was 97.93% White, 0.16% African American, 0.32% Native American, 0.80% Asian, 0.08% from other races, and 0.72% from two or more races. Hispanic or Latino of any race were 0.24% of the population.

There were 497 households, out of which 29.8% had children under the age of 18 living with them, 63.6% were married couples living together, 5.0% had a female householder with no husband present, and 28.8% were non-families. 21.9% of all households were made up of individuals, and 11.1% had someone living alone who was 65 years of age or older.  The average household size was 2.52 and the average family size was 2.97.

In the town, the age distribution of the population shows 22.6% under the age of 18, 5.1% from 18 to 24, 28.3% from 25 to 44, 29.0% from 45 to 64, and 14.9% who were 65 years of age or older.  The median age was 42 years. For every 100 females, there were 106.3 males.  For every 100 females age 18 and over, there were 105.1 males.

The median income for a household in the town was $62,798, and the median income for a family was $66,563. Males had a median income of $50,469 versus $35,250 for females. The per capita income for the town was $36,801.  About 2.8% of families and 3.3% of the population were below the poverty line, including 6.3% of those under age 18 and 2.1% of those age 65 or over.

Transportation
Connecticut Route 45 is the main north–south highway, while Connecticut Route 341 is the main east–west highway in the town. Route 45 leads north  to U.S. Route 7 in Cornwall and south the same distance to New Preston, while Route 341 leads southeast 5 miles to U.S. Route 202 at Woodville and west  to Kent.

Notable locations

 Warren Congregational Church – built in 1818 and added to the National Register of Historic Places in 1991.

Notable people
 Herbert Abrams (1921–2003), portrait artist
 Lorenzo Carter (1767–1814), the first permanent settler of Cleveland, Ohio; born in Warren
 Charles Finney (1792–1875), Presbyterian minister, leader in the Second Great Awakening; born in Warren
 Miloš Forman (1932–2018), film director; lived in Warren with his wife, Martina Forman, an author
 Morton Gottlieb (1921–2009), theatrical and film producer
 Cleve Gray (1918–2004), painter
 Francine du Plessix Gray (1930–2019), writer
 Philip Roth (1933–2018), writer; maintained a house in Warren

References

External links

Town of Warren official website
Warren Land Trust

 
Towns in Litchfield County, Connecticut
Towns in the New York metropolitan area
Towns in Connecticut